Talisman: Live in Nagoya is a live album by Painkiller, a band featuring John Zorn, Bill Laswell, and Mick Harris, performing live in Nagoya, Japan.

Reception

The AllMusic review by François Couture awarded the album 3 stars stating "Pain Killer started out in 1991 as an incredibly brutal and exhilarating avant-core trio. It gradually turned into a free-dub unit with much less ideas per minute... As it is, it will appeal to fans of the Execution Ground era of the trio – and even then it makes an interesting addition but is by no means an essential item."

Track listing
 "Batrachophrenoboocosmomachia" – 31:55
 "Transport Of Sorcerers" – 6:10
 "Ahamkara" – 10:00

Personnel
John Zorn – alto saxophone, vocals
Bill Laswell – bass
Mick Harris – drums, vocals
Technical
Oz Frith – recording engineer
Scott Hull – mastering
Chippy – design
Heun-Heung Chin – design
Tomoyo T.L. – design

References

Painkiller (band) albums
Albums produced by John Zorn
John Zorn live albums
2002 live albums
Tzadik Records live albums